Relating to black-powder firearms, a nipple wrench is used to unscrew nipples which hold percussion caps.

References  

Early firearms